The Addison White Sox was the initial moniker of the minor league baseball teams based in Addison, New York. In 1904 and 1905, Addison based teams played as members of the Independent level Southern Tier League. In 1905, Addison partnered with Wellsville, New York in 1905, playing as the "Addison-Wellsville Tobacco Strippers".

History
The 1904 Addison White Sox  began minor league play, as Addison became charter members of the Southern Tier League. The league formed as Independent level minor league, with the Corning White Ponies, Coudersport, Elmira, Hornellsville Maple Cities, Penn Yan Grape Pickers and Wellsville Oil Drillers joining Addison as charter members. League standings in some references list Hornellsville as the 1st place team, but August 20 newspaper accounts show Addison in 1st place with a 22–11 record and Harnellsville in 5th place with a 12–22 record. The league was also referred to as the "Southern Tier Association." The 1904 Addison manager was Bill Heine.

The 1905 Southern Tier League continued play as a four–team Independent league. The four teams included the Addison-Wellsville Tobacco Strippers, playing under returning manager Bill Hiene, as Addison partnered with neighboring Wellsville, New York. The Corning Glassblowers, Elmira and Hornellsville Bluebirds completed the league teams. The 1905 standings and statistics are unknown.

The Southern Tier League permanently folded as a minor league after the 1905 season. A league with the same name later played as a semi–pro league.

Addison, New York has not hosted another minor league team.

The ballpark
The name of the Addison minor league home ballpark is not directly referenced.

Timeline

Year–by–year records

Notable alumni

Lee DeMontreville (1904)
Bob Dresser (1905)
Gene Good (1905)
Lew Groh (1904)
Leo Hafford (1905)
Bill Mack (1904–1905)
Red Murray (1904) 1909 NL Home Run leader

See also
Addison White Sox players Addison-Wellsville Tobacco Strippers players

References

External links
Baseball Reference

Defunct minor league baseball teams
Southern Tier League teams
Steuben County, New York
Baseball teams established in 1904
Baseball teams disestablished in 1905